A Hungarian immigrant, Brigadier General Huba Wass de Czege (pronounced VOSH de TSEH-geh) (born August 13, 1941) is the son of Count Albert Wass de Szentegyed et Czege. Wass de Czege retired from the United States Army as a General Officer with a reputation as a highly innovative thinker.  He is the founder and first director of the School of Advanced Military Studies at the United States Army Command and General Staff College.

Career
He graduated as an infantry officer West Point in 1964. He was a platoon leader in the 8th Infantry Division stationed in West Germany. He was deployed to Vietnam in January 1967. During his first tour he was a senior advisor for a Vietnamese Ranger battalion. On his second tour he commanded Company A, 3rd Battalion, 503rd  Infantry Regiment. He served two tours in Vietnam where he earned five Bronze Stars, and the Silver Star for Gallantry in action. 
After returning from Vietnam he graduated from the Infantry Officer Advanced Course in 1970. After he attended John F. Kennedy School of Government at Harvard University. 
He also graduated from the Command and General Staff College at Fort Leavenworth in 1976. During these years he served in different series of assignements in the 9th Infantry Division: ha was also commander of the 1st Battalion, 60th Infantry Regiment. 

Wass De Czege was a principal designer of the operational concept known as AirLand Battle which was the doctrinal concept of the U.S. Army for many years. He was the founder and first director of the Army's School for Advanced Military Studies where he also taught applied military strategy.  In the late 1980s he was selected to command the 1st Brigade 9th Infantry Regiment of the 7th Infantry Division (Light).  His most senior military position was assistant division commander as a brigadier general of the 1st Infantry Division.  After retiring in 1993, Huba Wass De Czege became heavily involved in the Army After Next Project and served on several Defense Advanced Research Projects Agency advisory panels.

In the 1970s, Wass de Czege was a member of the Department of Social Sciences at West Point.  Source: Association of Graduates, USMA, The Register of Graduates and Former Cadets, USMA  West Point: 2008.

Since his 20s, Wass de Czege has been an enthusiastic horseman, and has been involved with schooling and showing jumpers and hunters.

He is a consultant to the U.S. Army Training and Doctrine Command.

Awards and decorations

References 

 Association of Graduates, USMA, The Register of Graduates and Former Cadets, USMA  West Point: 2008.

1941 births
Living people
Recipients of the Silver Star
United States Army personnel of the Vietnam War
United States Army generals
Harvard Kennedy School alumni
United States Military Academy alumni
Hungarian emigrants to the United States